George Johnson Armstrong (1902 – 9 July 1941) was the first British citizen to be executed under the Treachery Act 1940.  Only four other British subjects are known to have been executed under this Act; saboteur Jose Estelle Key (a Gibraltarian), Duncan Scott-Ford, Oswald John Job (born in London to German parents) and Theodore Schurch.

Armstrong was an engineer by occupation. He was tried on 8 May 1941 at the Central Criminal Court (the Old Bailey in London) and convicted for communicating with the German Consul in Boston, Massachusetts, to offer him assistance before the United States entered the Second World War. He was sentenced to death by Mr Justice Lewis.

His appeal on 23 June 1941, at the Court of Criminal Appeal, was dismissed, and on 10 July 1941  at the age of 39 Armstrong was executed by hanging at HM Prison Wandsworth by Thomas Pierrepoint.

References

Further reading
 John Bulloch, Akin to Treason, London: Arthur Barker Ltd., 1966.

1902 births
1941 deaths
Executed people from County Durham
20th-century British engineers
20th-century executions by England and Wales
People executed by the United Kingdom by hanging
Executed British collaborators with Nazi Germany
English World War II spies for Germany
People executed for spying for Nazi Germany